Wau Animation Studios is a Malaysian animation studio founded on 18 March 2013. It focuses on producing and developing original animated programmes for TV3 Malaysia, such as Ejen Ali. Its co-founder and CEO is Usamah Zaid Yasin after spending 7 years at Les' Copaque Production.

Filmography

Television

 Ejen Ali (2016–2023)
 Neon Luna

Film
 Ejen Ali: The Movie (28 November 2019)

Sequel
Ejen Ali: The Movie 2 (In development)

References

Notes

External links

2013 establishments in Malaysia
Malaysian animation studios
Malaysian companies established in 2013